Ian R. Kahn (born April 21, 1972) is an American stage, television actor and podcast host, perhaps best known for his roles on Turn: Washington's Spies, Dawson's Creek, Bull, The Unusuals and As the World Turns. He portrayed George Washington in 24 episodes of the 2014 TV series, Turn: Washington's Spies.

He made his Broadway debut in ENRON at the Broadhurst Theater in April 2010. In September 2009, he made his off-Broadway debut in MCC's Still Life. He has appeared in major regional theater companies across the United States. Some of his roles have included Mortimer in Arsenic and Old Lace at the Baltimore Center Stage, Algernon in The Importance of Being Earnest at the Arena Stage, Johnny Wheelwright in A Prayer For Owen Meany at Roundhouse theater, Tom in The Glass Menagerie at St. Louis Rep, Henry Higgins in My Fair Lady at The Media Theater, Septimus Hodge in Arcadia at the Wilma Theater, and as William Shakespeare in The Beard of Avon at the Cape Playhouse.

He co-hosts the Athletic's Under the Radar Podcast with Derek Van Riper and Nando Di Fino. He also does Fantasy Baseball Dynasty Rankings for the Athletic.

He graduated from the Ethical Culture Fieldston School in Riverdale, Bronx, New York in 1990 and from Skidmore College in Saratoga Springs, New York in 1994. Kahn is Jewish.

Filmography

Film

Television

References

External links

1972 births
American male stage actors
American male television actors
Living people
Male actors from New York City
People from the Bronx
Skidmore College alumni
Jewish American male actors
21st-century American Jews